Heidi S. Chumley is an American primary care physician and academic administrator specializing in family medicine. She has served as dean of the Ross University School of Medicine since 2021. Chumley was provost of the American University of the Caribbean from 2013 to 2021.

Life 
Chumley is from Seabrook, Texas. She attended Louisiana Tech University before transferring to Abilene Christian University as a freshmen in September 1988 where she played on their basketball team. On December 17 the same year, she was diagnosed with Guillain–Barré syndrome. Chumley earned a bachelor's degree in biochemistry from Abilene Christian University. She completed a M.D. from the University of Texas Health Science Center at San Antonio. She completed her residency there in family medicine and a fellowship in academic leadership. Chumley earned an executive M.B.A. with an emphasis on Latin America and the Caribbean from the University of Miami.

Chumley practiced family medicine before entering academia. For eight years, Chumley worked at the University of Kansas School of Medicine including as the vice chancellor for educational resources and interprofessional education. She was its senior associate dean for medical education. From 2013 to 2021, Chumley was the provost of the American University of the Caribbean. In 2021, she became dean of the Ross University School of Medicine. Chumley heads Adtalem Global Education's academic council.

Chumley has five children.

References 

Living people
Year of birth missing (living people)
Place of birth missing (living people)
People from Harris County, Texas
Abilene Christian Wildcats athletes
University of Texas Health Science Center at San Antonio alumni
University of Miami alumni
Ross University School of Medicine faculty
Heads of universities and colleges in the United States
Women heads of universities and colleges
American university and college faculty deans
Women deans (academic)
21st-century American women physicians
21st-century American physicians
Family physicians
American primary care physicians